Wauwermans Islands is a group of small, low, snow-covered islands forming the northernmost group in the Wilhelm Archipelago. Discovered by a German expedition 1873–74, under Dallmann. Sighted by the Belgian Antarctic Expedition, 1897–99, under Gerlache, and named for Lieutenant General Wauwermans, president of the Société Royale Belge de Géographie, a supporter of the expedition.

Islands in group

 Brown Island
 Friar Island
 Guido Island
 Heed Rock
 Host Island
 Knight Island
 Kril Island
 Lobel Island
 Manciple Island
 Mida Island
 Prevot Island
 Prioress Island
 Reeve Island
 Sinclair Island
 Squire Island
 Vetrilo Rocks
 Wednesday Island
 Yato Rocks
 Zherav Island

See also 
Gerlache Strait Geology
Anvers Island Geology
 List of Antarctic and sub-Antarctic islands

Islands of the Wilhelm Archipelago